Krystsina Siarheyeuna Tsimanouskaya (Łacinka: , ; born 19 November 1996) is a Belarusian-Polish sprinter. She has won numerous medals at various events, including a silver medal in the 100 metres at the 2017 European U23 Championships, a gold medal in the 200 metres at the 2019 Summer Universiade, and a silver medal in the team event at the 2019 European Games.

Tsimanouskaya qualified to represent Belarus at the 2020 Summer Olympics in the women's 100 m and 200 m events. On 30 July 2021, during the Games, she accused officials from the Belarus Olympic Committee of forcing her to compete in the 4×400 metres relay race without her consent. On 1 August 2021, she was taken to Tokyo's Haneda Airport against her will, where she refused to board a flight back to Belarus. She was eventually given police protection and granted a humanitarian visa by Poland.

Early life
Krystsina Siarheyeuna Tsimanouskaya was born in Klimavichy, a town in eastern Belarus. Though she raced for fun as a child, she joined competitive athletics late, receiving an offer from an Olympic trainer to join his academy when she was about 15 years old. Her parents were initially worried, thinking she would not achieve an athletic career; they were convinced by Tsimanouskaya and her grandmother.

International competitions

Tokyo 2020 Olympics
Tsimanouskaya qualified for her first Olympics in the 100 m and 200 m events, representing Belarus. On 30 July 2021 (postponed from 2020 because of the COVID-19 pandemic), she finished 4th in the first round heat of the 100 m event with a time of 11.47. Prior to the 200 m event, Belarus Olympic Committee (NOC RB) officials withdrew her from the competition. On 2 August, the Court of Arbitration for Sport (CAS) rejected Tsimanouskaya's request to annul the decision of the NOC RB to stop her from participating at the Tokyo Olympics, stating that she was unable to prove her case. On 3 August, the CAS clarified that its judgement was based on the fact that Tsimanouskaya could not prove she would still attempt to compete at Tokyo while she was in the process of seeking asylum in other countries.

Repatriation incident and asylum

On 30 July 2021, Tsimanouskaya recorded an Instagram video criticising officials from the Belarus Olympic Committee (NOC RB), saying that they had entered her in the 4 × 400 m relay race, a distance she had never contested, without her consent. On 1 August 2021, Belarusian media reported the attempt to forcibly return Tsimanouskaya to Belarus. Tsimanouskaya said to journalists that she was afraid of returning to Belarus, and she intended to claim asylum.  After contacting airport police, on 2 August, she was granted a humanitarian visa to Poland.

Though most of western Europe had offered her protection, she reportedly chose to seek asylum in Poland as the country had expressly offered her the opportunity to continue competing; the IOC made contact with officials from the Polish Olympic Committee (PKOI) regarding Tsimanouskaya resuming competition. On 4 August, Tsimanouskaya flew to Warsaw Chopin Airport, where she was met by Polish officials and Belarusian expatriates. President of the IOC Thomas Bach and the Japanese foreign ministry both gave statements on 6 August describing what happened to Tsimanouskaya as "deplorable" and "unjust".

Personal bests
Outdoor
100 metres – 11.04 (+0.7 m/s, Minsk 2018)
200 metres – 22.78 (−1.2 m/s, Minsk 2019)

Indoor
60 metres – 7.21 (Mogilyov 2017)
200 metres – 23.62 (Mogilyov 2019)

Notes

References

Further reading
 
 
 

1996 births
Athletes (track and field) at the 2019 European Games
Athletes (track and field) at the 2020 Summer Olympics
Belarusian defectors
Belarusian expatriate sportspeople in Poland
Belarusian female sprinters
Belarusian refugees
European Games medalists in athletics
European Games silver medalists for Belarus
Living people
Medalists at the 2019 Summer Universiade
Olympic athletes of Belarus
People from Klimavichy
Refugees in Poland
Universiade gold medalists for Belarus
Universiade gold medalists in athletics (track and field)
Olympic female sprinters
Sportspeople from Mogilev Region